Permoceras, the sole member of the family Permoceratidae, is a genus of coiled nautiloids with a smooth, compressed involute shell, whorls higher than wide, earlier whorls hidden from view. The venter is rounded as are the  ventral and umbilical shoulders, the flanks flattened. The siphuncle is ventrally subcentral. The suture, which is most characteristic, has a deep, narrow pointed ventral lobe and large, asymmetrical pointed lobes on either side.

Permoceras is included in the nautilid superfamily, Trigonocerataceae, and is derived from the Mississippian (L Carb) - Triassic Grypoceratidae. Permoceras was first identified in the Lower Permian of Timur in the East Indies and named by Miller and Collinson in 1953

The coiling and whorl structure of Permoceras almost precisely resembles those of Pseudonautilus from the Upper Jurassic.

See also

 Nautiloid
 List of nautiloids

References

  1964; Nautiloidea-Nautilida, Treatise on Invertebrate Paleontology, Part K Nautiliodea, Geological Society  of America and University of Kansas press
 Sepkoski, J.J. Jr. 2002. A compendium of fossil marine animal genera. D.J. Jablonski & M.L. Foote (eds.). Bulletins of American Paleontology 363: 1–560. Sepkoski's Online Genus Database (CEPHALOPODA)

Prehistoric nautiloid genera